is a video game franchise created by Shigeru Miyamoto and owned by Nintendo. It follows the adventures of a gorilla named Donkey Kong and his ape and monkey friends. The franchise primarily consists of platform games—originally single-screen action puzzle games and later side-scrolling platformers. The first is the 1981 arcade game Donkey Kong, debuting the main antagonist Donkey Kong and the hero Mario, in an industrial construction setting. The game was a massive success and was followed by two sequels released in 1982 and 1983. In 1994, the franchise was relaunched with the platformer Donkey Kong Country, in which Donkey Kong is antagonized by a variety of anthropomorphic enemies, mainly the Kremlings, a clan of crocodiles led by King K. Rool, who has stolen the Kongs' banana hoard. 

Games outside the platforming genre include spin-offs of various genres including rhythm games such as Donkey Konga, racing games such as Diddy Kong Racing, and edutainment such as Donkey Kong Jr. Math. An icon of the Donkey Kong franchise is barrels, which the Kongs use as weapons, vehicles, furniture, and lodging. A total of more than 80 million copies in the Donkey Kong franchise have been sold worldwide as of 2022.

History

1981–1982: Conception and first game 

In the late 1970s, the Japanese company Nintendo shifted its focus from producing toys and playing cards to arcade games. This followed the 1973 oil crisis having increased the cost of manufacturing toys and the success of Taito's Space Invaders (1978). In 1980, Nintendo released Radar Scope, a Space Invaders-style shoot 'em up. It was a commercial failure and put the newly established subsidiary Nintendo of America in a financial crisis. Its founder, Minoru Arakawa, asked his father in-law, the Nintendo CEO Hiroshi Yamauchi, to provide a new game that could salvage the unsold Radar Scope cabinets. Most of Nintendo's top developers were preoccupied, so the task went to Shigeru Miyamoto, a first-time game designer.

Supervised by Gunpei Yokoi, Miyamoto settled on a love triangle with the characters Bluto, Popeye, and Olive Oyl from the Popeye franchise, but Nintendo was unable to obtain the license. Bluto evolved into a gorilla, an animal Miyamoto said was "nothing too evil or repulsive". He named the character Donkey Kong—donkey to convey stubborn and kong to imply gorilla. Popeye became Mario, the new protagonist, while Olive Oyl became Pauline, the damsel in distress. Miyamoto named "Beauty and the Beast" and the 1933 film King Kong as influences. As he lacked programming expertise, he consulted technicians on whether his concepts were possible. Four programmers from Ikegami Tsushinki spent three months turning Miyamoto's concept into a finished game.

Donkey Kong was one of the earliest platform games, following Mario as he ascends a construction site to rescue Pauline from Donkey Kong. It was released in July 1981 and became Nintendo's first major international success. The windfall of  rescued Nintendo of America from its financial crisis and established it as a prominent brand in America. Donkey Kong achieved further success in 1982, when Nintendo released a Game & Watch version and licensed it to Coleco for ports to home consoles. It grossed $4.4 billion across various formats, making it one of the highest-grossing games of all time. In 1982, Universal City Studios filed a lawsuit alleging Donkey Kong violated its trademark of King Kong. The lawsuit failed when Nintendo's lawyer, Howard Lincoln, discovered that Universal had won a lawsuit years prior by declaring that King Kong was actually in the public domain. The victory cemented Nintendo as a major player in the video game industry.

1982–1994: Sequels and first hiatus 
Miyamoto and his team had designed game mechanics and levels for Donkey Kong that could not be included, so they used them as the basis for a sequel. Miyamoto wanted to make Donkey Kong the protagonist, but the sprite was too big to easily maneuver, so he created a new character, Donkey Kong Jr. The team still wanted Donkey Kong on top of the screen, so they conceived a plot in which Mario had caged him and Donkey Kong Jr. had to save him. To develop Donkey Kong Jr., Nintendo reverse-engineered Ikegami's Donkey Kong code, making it the first game that Nintendo developed without outside help. Following Donkey Kong Jr. release in 1982, Ikegami sued Nintendo for copyright infringement. In 1990, the Tokyo High Court ruled in favor of Ikegami, and the companies reached a settlement.

Donkey Kong 3, released in 1983, features shooter gameplay that departs from its predecessors. Instead of Mario, the player controls Stanley, an exterminator from the Game & Watch game Green House (1982) who must protect Donkey Kong from a swarm of bees. Donkey Kong 3 was unsuccessful, as was an edutainment game for the Nintendo Entertainment System (NES), Donkey Kong Jr. Math (1983). The franchise went on an extended hiatus, while the spin-off Mario franchise found success on the NES, cementing Mario as Nintendo's mascot. The 1987 Official Nintendo Player's Guide advertised a Donkey Kong revival for the NES, The Return of Donkey Kong, which was never released. In 1994, the franchise's first original game in more than 10 years, Donkey Kong (often referred to as Donkey Kong '94), was released for the Game Boy. It begins as a remake of the 1981 game before introducing over 100 puzzle-platforming levels that incorporate elements from Donkey Kong Jr. and Super Mario Bros. 2 (1988).

1994–1996: Rare and Donkey Kong Country 

Around 1992, Rare, a British studio founded by the brothers Tim and Chris Stamper, purchased Silicon Graphics, Inc. (SGI) Challenge workstations with Alias rendering software to render 3D models. At the time, Nintendo was embroiled in a console war with Sega, whose Genesis competed with the Super Nintendo Entertainment System (SNES). Nintendo wanted a game to compete with Sega's Aladdin (1993), which featured graphics by Disney animators, when Lincoln learned of Rare's SGI experiments during a trip to Europe. After impressing Nintendo with a demonstration, Tim Stamper—inspired by Mortal Kombat use of digitized footage in place of hand-drawn art—suggested developing a platform game that used pre-rendered 3D graphics.

Nintendo granted the Stampers permission to use the Donkey Kong intellectual property; some sources indicate that the Stampers obtained the license after Nintendo offered them its catalog of characters and they chose Donkey Kong, though the designer Gregg Mayles recalled that it was Nintendo that requested a Donkey Kong game. Nintendo figured licensing Donkey Kong posed minimal risk due to the franchise's dormancy. Rare's reboot, Donkey Kong Country, featured side-scrolling gameplay that Mayles based on the Super Mario series. It was the first Donkey Kong game neither directed nor produced by Miyamoto, though he provided support and contributed design ideas.

Donkey Kong Country was one of the first games for a mainstream home video game console to use pre-rendered graphics, achieved through a compression technique that allowed Rare to convert 3D models into SNES sprites with little loss of detail. Because Donkey Kong did not have much of an established universe, Rare was free to expand it, introducing Donkey Kong's sidekick Diddy Kong (who replaced Donkey Kong Jr.) and the antagonistic Kremlings. After 18 months of development, Donkey Kong Country was released in November 1994 to acclaim, with critics hailing its visuals as groundbreaking. It was a major success, selling 9.3 million copies and becoming the third-bestselling SNES game. It reestablished Donkey Kong as a major Nintendo franchise and heralded Donkey Kong's transition from villain to hero. Following the success, Nintendo purchased a large minority stake in Rare.

Rare began developing concepts for a Donkey Kong Country sequel during production, and Nintendo green-lit the project immediately after the success. Donkey Kong Country 2: Diddy's Kong Quest, released in 1995, features Diddy rescuing a kidnapped Donkey Kong and introduces Diddy's girlfriend Dixie Kong. Diddy's Kong Quest was designed to be less linear and more challenging, with a theme reflecting Gregg Mayles' fascination with pirates. Like its predecessor, Diddy's Kong Quest was a major critical and commercial success, and is the sixth-bestselling SNES game. Following Diddy's Kong Quest, the Donkey Kong Country team split in two, with one half working on Donkey Kong Country 3: Dixie Kong's Double Trouble! (1996). Featuring Dixie and a new character, Kiddy Kong, as protagonists, the Dixie Kong's Double Trouble! team sought to incorporate 3D-esque gameplay and Zelda-inspired role-playing elements. Although it was released late in the SNES's lifespan and after the launch of the Nintendo 64, Dixie Kong's Double Trouble! sold well.

1995–2001: Franchise expansion 
Separate Rare teams developed the Game Boy games Donkey Kong Land (1995), Donkey Kong Land 2 (1996), and Donkey Kong Land III (1997), which condensed the Country series' gameplay for the handheld game console. Rare's Game Boy programmer, Paul Machacek, chose to develop Land as an original game rather than as a port of Country after convincing Tim Stamper it would be a better use of resources. A port of Country was eventually released for the Game Boy Color in 2000. Rare also developed a tech demo for a Virtual Boy Donkey Kong game, but it never progressed due to the system's commercial failure.

The first Donkey Kong game for the Nintendo 64, Diddy Kong Racing, was released as Nintendo's major 1997 Christmas shopping season product. Rare originally developed it as a sequel to its NES game R.C. Pro-Am (1988), but added Diddy Kong to increase its marketability. Diddy Kong Racing received favorable reviews and sold 4.5 million copies. Two of Diddy Kong Racing playable characters, Banjo the Bear and Conker the Squirrel, would go on to star in the Banjo-Kazooie and Conker franchises.

Rare began working on Donkey Kong 64, the first Donkey Kong game to feature 3D gameplay, in 1997. They conceived it as a linear game similar to the Country series, but switched to a more open-ended design using the game engine from their 1998 game Banjo-Kazooie after 18 months. Donkey Kong 64 was released in November 1999, accompanied by a 22 million marketing campaign. It was Nintendo's bestselling game during the 1999 Christmas season and received positive reviews, though critics felt it did not match the revolutionary impact of Donkey Kong Country.

2002–2010: After Rare 
At E3 2001, Nintendo and Rare announced three Donkey Kong projects: the GameCube game Donkey Kong Racing and the Game Boy Advance (GBA) games Donkey Kong Coconut Crackers and Diddy Kong Pilot. However, development costs were increasing and Nintendo opted not to acquire Rare. In September 2002, Microsoft acquired Rare for $375 million, making Rare a first-party developer for Xbox. Nintendo retained the rights to Donkey Kong under the terms of the acquisition. Donkey Kong Racing was canceled, and Rare reworked Donkey Kong Coconut Crackers and Diddy Kong Pilot into It's Mr. Pants (2004) and Banjo-Pilot (2005).

Nintendo mostly relegated Donkey Kong to spin-offs and guest appearances in other franchises, such as Mario Kart, Mario Party and Super Smash Bros. In 2003, Nintendo and Namco released Donkey Konga (2003), a spin-off rhythm game. It was designed for the DK Bongos, a GameCube peripheral that resembles bongo drums. Nintendo of America executive Reggie Fils-Aimé opposed releasing Donkey Konga, concerned it would damage the Donkey Kong brand, but it sold well and received positive reviews. It was followed by Donkey Konga 2 (2004) and the Japan exclusive Donkey Konga 3 (2005).

Donkey Kong Jungle Beat, the first main Donkey Kong game since Donkey Kong 64, was released for the GameCube in 2004. It returned to the Donkey Kong Country style of platforming, controlled using the DK Bongos. It was directed by Yoshiaki Koizumi as the debut project of Nintendo EAD Tokyo. Koizumi sought to create an accessible game with a simple control scheme to contrast with more complex contemporary games. It received positive reviews, but was a commercial disappointment.  A Wii version, featuring revised Wii Remote and Nunchuk controls, was released in 2008 as part of the New Play Control! line. A racing game that used the DK Bongos, Donkey Kong Barrel Blast, was developed by Paon for the GameCube, but was moved to the Wii with support for the peripheral dropped. It was released in 2007 to negative reviews, with criticism for its controls.

Despite the acquisition, Rare continued to develop games for Nintendo's handheld consoles since Microsoft did not have a competing handheld. It developed ports of the Country games for the GBA and Diddy Kong Racing for the Nintendo DS with additional content, released between 2003 and 2007. Meanwhile, Paon developed DK: King of Swing (2005) for the GBA and DK: Jungle Climber (2007) for the DS, which blend Country elements with gameplay inspired by Clu Clu Land (1984). Mario vs. Donkey Kong, a series that acts as a spiritual successor to Donkey Kong '94, began with a 2004 GBA game and continued on the DS with March of the Minis (2006), Minis March Again! (2009), and Mini-Land Mayhem! (2010). In contrast to other post-Country games, Mario vs. Donkey Kong restored Donkey Kong's villainous role.

2010–present: Retro Studios and second hiatus 
In 2008, Miyamoto expressed interest in a Donkey Kong Country revival. The producer Kensuke Tanabe suggested that Retro Studios, which had developed the Metroid Prime series, would be suitable. With Donkey Kong Country Returns, Retro sought to retain classic Country elements while refining them to create a new experience and introducing new game mechanics such as surface-clinging and simultaneous multiplayer. Returns, the first original Country game since Dixie Kong's Double Trouble!, was released for the Wii in 2010. It sold 4.21 million copies in under a month and received positive reviews, with critics considering it a return to form for the franchise. Monster Games developed a Nintendo 3DS version in 2013.

Retro developed a sequel, Donkey Kong Country: Tropical Freeze, for the Wii U. The Wii U's greater processing power allowed for visual elements that the team had been unable to accomplish on the Wii, such as lighting and translucency effects and dynamic camera movement. Tropical Freeze was released in 2014 to favorable reviews, but it sold poorly in comparison to Returns. It achieved greater success when it was ported to the Nintendo Switch in 2018, outselling the Wii U version within a week of release. Following Tropical Freeze, the Donkey Kong franchise went on another hiatus, outside of the Mario vs. Donkey Kong games Tipping Stars (2015) and Mini Mario & Friends: Amiibo Challenge (2016) for the Wii U and 3DS. Nintendo Life reported in 2021 that Nintendo Entertainment Planning & Development was working on a Switch Donkey Kong game.

Plot

Setting
The original game is set on a construction site that is alluded to many times in later games. The Game Boy remake and Donkey Kong Land feature the world of Big City, acknowledged by Nintendo as the setting of the arcade game. In the Super Mario series, "New Donk City" in Super Mario Odyssey, of which Pauline is mayor, features numerous references to the original Donkey Kong. In Mario Kart Tour, New York City, also the setting of Mario Bros., uses the same aesthetics as New Donk City, prominently featuring Pauline and the original Donkey Kong.

A jungle setting is used first in Donkey Kong Junior and more expansively in Donkey Kong Country, which depicts the Kongs' native habitat, Donkey Kong Island. This island is the primary setting of Land, 64, Returns, and Tropical Freeze.

Gangplank Galleon is a pirate ship commanded by K. Rool and featured in Country, Land, Country 2, Land 2, and 64. Many levels are set on the deck, inside the hull, on top of the rigging, and around the ship.

Crocodile Isle is home of the Kremlings and appears in Country 2 and Land 2. It features swamps, castles, volcanoes, caves, an amusement park and an enormous hornet's nest. After it is destroyed, the Kremlings build a mechanical version of Crocodile Isle and attempt to use it to destroy Donkey Kong Island.

The Northern Kremisphere is a region with a Second Industrial Revolution theme that serves as the setting for Country 3 and Land 3.

Characters 

The Kongs and various other animals in the franchise have displayed varying degrees of anthropomorphism. Donkey Kong originally appears as a simple ape, and later characterization of the Kongs includes full speech, clothing, and mechanical and alchemical knowledge. The Kremlings are depicted similarly, being shown as having invented advanced machines in some games. In Donkey Kong 64, the Kremlings operate an mechanical island built by Snide the Weasel.

Other animals are usually less anthropomorphized, with animal buddies being depicted as akin to pets and enemies as simple obstacles.

Meta-awareness 
Characters in the franchise at certain points make meta-references to demonstrate full awareness of being in a video game. The premise of Donkey Kong Land is the protagonists intentionally reenacting the events of Donkey Kong Country on the Game Boy to prove that the gameplay will be as good as on the SNES. In other games, Cranky Kong describes the simpler graphics of the arcade games, and some of the game manuals are written from his point of view.

Mario, Yoshi, and Link appear in Diddy's Kong Quest, being acknowledged as video game heroes, and Sonic and Earthworm Jim are alluded to as "no hopers" in reference to their rivalry as other companies' platforming mascots.

Characters in the Kongs' world have been shown playing real video games. In Dixie Kong's Double Trouble, Wrinkly Kong plays Super Mario 64. Killer Instinct arcade cabinets appear in Donkey Kong Country and Diddy's Kong Quest. A playable Donkey Kong arcade cabinet and Jetpac game appear within Donkey Kong 64. Banjo and Conker play on Game Boy units in Banjo-Kazooie and Conker's Bad Fur Day respectively, the former playing one of the Donkey Kong Land games and the latter Killer Instinct.

Gameplay 
Barrels appear prominently in the franchise, first appearing as obstacles that Mario must avoid. The Donkey Kong Country series expands their role to weapons, powerups, vehicles, warps, and enemies. Examples include DK Barrels, which release a partner Kong from confinement when thrown, Blast Barrels, which act as cannons that launch the Kongs, and Invincibility Barrels for temporary invulnerability. Climbing and swinging on vines and ropes has featured consistently in the series. Climbing appears first in Junior. Donkey Kong for Game Boy introduces horizontal rope climbing. Country introduces swinging on vines. The platforming trope of rideable mine carts, and analogous vehicles such as rollercoaster cars and toboggans, appear in all of the Country games. A rolling vehicle appears in the Donkey Kong attraction in Nintendo Land.

Playable characters
The arcade trilogy, SNES trilogy, and Game Boy trilogy feature a different main playable character in each game: Mario, Donkey Kong Jr., and Stanley in the former and Donkey Kong, Diddy Kong, and Dixie Kong in the latter two. The Country and Land games allow the player to swap to a second character when they are in their party. Donkey Kong 64 and the Retro games implement character swapping.

Other media

Television series 
The Saturday Supercade is the character's first role in a television series. In it, Donkey Kong (voiced by Soupy Sales) has escaped from the circus and Mario (voiced by Peter Cullen) and Pauline (voiced by Judy Strangis) are chasing the ape. As with the original game, Donkey Kong will often grab Pauline, and Mario has to save her.

The Donkey Kong Country television series was developed based on the game of the same name. The animation was produced in Canada, but located in Toronto and aired in France in 1997 and in the United States on Fox Kids in 1998 to 1999, the series lasted two seasons with 40 total episodes featuring exclusive characters including Bluster Kong, Eddie the Mean Old Yeti and Kaptain Scurvy.

The Planet of Donkey Kong, later DKTV.cool was broadcast in France from September 4, 1996, to September 1, 2001. It was presented by Mélanie Angélie and Donkey Kong, voiced by Nicolas Bienvenu. After the departure of Angélie, the programme continued without a host and was renamed as DKTV.cool on July 1, 2000. The show had several editions, especially during the summer, including "Diddy's Holidays", airing on weekends around 7 am during mid-1997, and Donkey Kong Beach at 9.30 on Saturday mornings in the same year.

Film 
A 2007 documentary, The King of Kong: A Fistful of Quarters, chronicles the competitive following for the arcade version of Donkey Kong.

The original arcade version of Donkey Kong is the last villain of the 2015 film Pixels.

Donkey Kong and Cranky Kong are set to appear in Illumination's The Super Mario Bros. Movie, scheduled to be released on April 5, 2023, voiced by Seth Rogen and Fred Armisen respectively. In November 2021, sources stated that Illumination was developing a Donkey Kong spin-off film, with Rogen set to reprise his role.

Reception

The Donkey Kong franchise has generally received positive critical reception, despite some spin-offs received more mixed reception.

Both Donkey Kong and Donkey Kong Country are frequently cited as two of the best video games of all time; the former for its impact on the golden age of arcade video games, and the latter for its "groundbreaking" usage of pre-rendered 3D graphics and atmospheric music. Maxim included Donkey Kong Country at number 14 on their list of 'The 30 Best Video Game Franchises of All Time', describing the series as "some of the best platforming games on Nintendo's consoles". In the 2017 book the 100 Greatest Video Game Franchises, Donkey Kong is characterized as "a symbol, representing both the timelessness and timeliness of video games".

Legacy
After the first Donkey Kong was released, Universal Studios sued Nintendo, alleging that the video game was a trademark infringement of King Kong, the plot and characters of which Universal claimed for their own. In the case, Universal City Studios, Inc. v. Nintendo Co., Ltd., a United States District Court ruled that Universal had acted in bad faith, and that it had no right over the name King Kong or the characters and story. The court further held that there was no possibility for consumers to confuse Nintendo's game and characters with the King Kong films and their characters. The case was an enormous victory for Nintendo, which was still a newcomer to the U.S. market. The case established the company as a major player in the industry and arguably gave the company the confidence that it could compete with the giants of American media.

The success of the Donkey Kong series has resulted in Guinness World Records awarding the series with seven world records in the Guinness World Records: Gamer's Edition 2008. The records include: "First Use of Visual Storytelling in a Video Game" for the rudimentary cut scenes featured in the original Donkey Kong arcade game, and "Most Collectible Items in a Platform Game" for Donkey Kong 64.

The original game is the focus of the 2007 documentary The King of Kong: A Fistful of Quarters.

In 2007, the USHRA Monster Jam racing series licensed Donkey Kong's appearance for a monster truck. The truck is driven by Frank Krmel, and is owned by Feld Motorsports. The truck is decorated to look like the character and has Donkey Kong's tie on the front. The truck made its first introduction in the Monster Jam event at the Hubert H. Humphrey Metrodome in Minneapolis, Minnesota, United States on December 8, 2007. It went to the Monster Jam World Finals 9, as well as World Finals 10, where it was the fastest qualifier.

"It's on like Donkey Kong" is an expression used in pop culture that is inspired by the original game. Nintendo requested a trademark on the phrase with the United States Patent and Trademark Office in November 2010.

Crossovers

Mario Kart series 

The Donkey Kong series has been represented in every game of the Mario Kart series. Donkey Kong appears racing alongside characters from Mario and other franchises. The first character from the Donkey Kong series to appear as a playable character in the Mario Kart series is Jr. in Super Mario Kart. The adult Donkey Kong first appears in  Mario Kart 64, Diddy appears in Mario Kart: Double Dash, Mario Kart Wii and Mario Kart Tour. At the era of partnership with Paon (2005–2007), Funky Kong appears in Mario Kart Wii. He made a return in Mario Kart Tour along with Dixie Kong, which marks the first appearance in the Mario series since the partnership with Paon was ended. Additionally, the Mario Kart series features several Donkey Kong themed tracks, most notably DK Jungle from Mario Kart 7 and Mario Kart 8, which is based on the world of Donkey Kong Country Returns.

Mario Party series 

In the Mario Party series, Donkey Kong debuted as a playable character in Mario Party for the Nintendo 64, a role he kept until Mario Party 5. Here, he was given a space on the board maps as a foil to Bowser. He returned as a playable character in Mario Party 10 for the Wii U, Mario Party: Star Rush for the Nintendo 3DS, and Mario Party Superstars for the Nintendo Switch. Diddy Kong makes cameo appearances in Mario Party DS and Mario Party 9, and is an unlockable character in Mario Party: Star Rush and Super Mario Party.

Mario sports series 

Donkey Kong has appeared as a playable character in almost every game of the Mario sports series since the Nintendo 64 era, including Mario Golf, Mario Tennis, Super Mario Strikers, and Mario Superstar Baseball. The first character from the Donkey Kong series that appears as a playable character in the Mario sports series is Donkey Kong Jr. in Mario's Tennis. Diddy is also featured as a playable character in many games. At the era of partnership with Paon (2004–2008), other additional characters apart from Donkey Kong and Diddy Kong, such as Dixie, Funky, Tiny, and Baby Donkey Kong, but also Kritter, Klaptrap and King K. Rool, have made sporadic appearances. Donkey Kong appears as a playable character in Mario & Sonic at the Olympic Winter Games and every game in the Mario & Sonic series thereafter. Diddy was introduced to the series in Mario & Sonic at the Rio 2016 Olympic Games.

Mario vs. Donkey Kong series 

Nintendo's first Donkey Kong game for the Game Boy Advance after Rare left was Mario vs. Donkey Kong, a return to the earlier arcade-style games that incorporated many elements from the Game Boy version. While its style was that of other games, the Rare design for Donkey Kong carried over. The modern Donkey Kong assumes the villain role in the game: wanting a Mini Mario clockwork toy, he finds that they are sold out at a local toy store. Enraged, he terrifies the Toads at the factory and steals the toys. This sets up the game's plot, where Mario chases Donkey Kong until he can take the Mini Marios back from Donkey Kong. The game was followed by March of the Minis for the Nintendo DS, Minis March Again on DSiWare, Mini-Land Mayhem in 2010 for the DS, Minis on the Move for the Nintendo 3DS in 2013 and Tipping Stars for the Nintendo 3DS and Wii U in 2015.

Super Smash Bros. series 

Donkey Kong has appeared as a playable character in every game of the Super Smash Bros. series first appearing as one of eight characters in the original Super Smash Bros. for the Nintendo 64. He is the first heavy fighter in the series, and featured many slow but powerful attacks. Diddy Kong was later introduced as a playable character in Super Smash Bros. Brawl as an agile fighter. In Super Smash Bros. Ultimate, King K. Rool was introduced as a playable character, bringing with him an arsenal of his attacks from the Rare games' boss fights. Banjo and Kazooie were revealed as part of the first Fighter Pass for Ultimate in 2019 in a trailer set at Donkey Kong's treehouse, acknowledging Banjo's origins in the Kongs' world. Other characters, like Cranky and Dixie, have appeared throughout the series as collectible trophies. There have been many stages based on games in the Donkey Kong series, including Congo (Kongo) Jungle in Super Smash Bros., Kongo Jungle and Jungle Japes in Super Smash Bros. Melee, Rumble Falls and 75m in Super Smash Bros. Brawl, and Jungle Hijinx in Super Smash Bros. for Nintendo 3DS and Wii U. Kongo Jungle from Super Smash Bros. Melee, renamed Kongo Falls, returns in Super Smash Bros. Ultimate, along with the N64 Kongo Jungle, Jungle Japes, and 75m.

Notes

Sales notes

References

Citations

Works cited

External links 

 Donkey Kong at MobyGames
 Donkey Kong at Classicgaming.cc
 Donkey Kong Rap on YouTube

 
 
Nintendo franchises
Video game franchises
Video game franchises introduced in 1981
Video games adapted into television shows
Video games produced by Shigeru Miyamoto